Campionato Primavera 2 is an Italian football youth competition. The first edition of the Campionato Primavera was held in the 1962–63 season, and a separate playoff for Serie B club took place. This tradition was discontinued after 1969. In 2017–18 season it split into two leagues: Campionato Primavera 1 and Campionato Primavera 2, organized by Lega Serie A and Lega Serie B respectively. Primavera2 is divided in two geographical leagues, the overall winner is decided through the Supercoppa Primavera 2.

Format
Primavera2 is linked with Primavera1 through a promotion/relegation system, but the respective senior club must be member of one of two Italian national football leagues, the Lega Serie A or the Lega Serie B: if the first team is relegated to the Serie C, the youth team is excluded by both Primavera championships and transferred to the Campionato Nazionale Dante Berretti, and eventual re-admissions of other teams take place.

Primavera2 is divided in two leagues, for Northern and Southern Italy. The winners of these leagues are promoted to Primavera1, while national playoffs for a third promotion take place.

Past winners

Primavera B

Primavera2

See also
Coppa Italia Primavera
Serie B
Serie A

References

External links
 

Youth football competitions in Italy
Italy